Ladrones (English: Bandits) is a comedy film directed by Joe Menendez. It is the sequel to the film Ladrón que roba a ladrón produced in 2007. Starring Fernando Colunga, Eduardo Yáñez and Miguel Varoni, it was released on October 9, 2015.

Cast 
Fernando Colunga as Alejandro Toledo
Eduardo Yáñez as Santiago Guzmán
Miguel Varoni as Emilio Sánchez
Jessica Lindsey as Miranda Kilroy
Frank Perozo as Rex
Nashla Bogaert as María Elena
Oscar Torre as Miguelito
Evelyna Rodriguez as Maribel
Cristina Rodlo as Jackie Ramirez
Vadhir Derbez as Ray
Carmen Beato as Josefa Ramírez
Jon Molerio as Carlos

References

External links 

 

2015 comedy films